Little Freddie King (born Fread Eugene Martin, July 19, 1940) is an American Delta blues guitarist. His style is based on that of Freddie King, but his approach to country blues is original.

Biography
King, a cousin of Lightnin' Hopkins, was born in McComb, Mississippi, and learned to play the guitar from his father. In 1954, at the age of 14, he moved to New Orleans. He performed in juke joints with his friends Babe Stovall, Slim Harpo, and Champion Jack Dupree, playing both acoustic and electric guitar.

He recorded the first electric blues album in New Orleans with Harmonica Williams in 1969. In 1976, King undertook a European tour with Bo Diddley and John Lee Hooker. His next recording opportunity came in 1996, twenty-seven years after his first, with the release of Swamp Boogie. King's Sing Sang Sung (2000) was recorded live at the Dream Palace in Faubourg Marigny.

King is a charter member of the New Orleans Jazz & Heritage Festival and has played at the festival for 42 years. He is a member of the Louisiana Music Hall of Fame. He was selected three times as Blues Performer of the Year in New Orleans. He was honored with a Mississippi Blues Trail marker in McComb, Mississippi. In 2007, King co-contributed to the Alabama Slim album, The Mighty Flood.

His 2012 album, Chasing tha Blues, won Best Blues Album at the 12th Annual Independent Music Awards. He appeared in the 2015 documentary film I Am the Blues.

King's most recent album, Jaw Jackin' Blues, was released in 2020.

Discography
Harmonica Williams and Little Freddie King (1969), Ahura Mazda Records
Swamp Boogie (1996), Orleans Records
Sing Sang Sung (live album) (2000), Orleans Records
FQF Live (2003), WWOZ (Library of Congress Recording)
You Don't Know What I Know (2005), Fat Possum Records
Messin' Around tha House (2008), Madewright Records
Gotta Walk with Da King (2010), Madewright Records
Jazzfest Live (2011), MunckMix, Inc.
Back in Vinyl, LP (2011), APO Records
Chasing tha Blues (2012), Madewright Records
Messin' Around tha Living Room (2015), Madewright Records
Fried Rice & Chicken (2018), Orleans Records
Queen and Slim: The Soundtrack (2019), Motown Records
Jaw Jackin' Blues (2020), Madewright Records

References

External links

Official website
The Gutbucket King, multimedia profile of King by Barry Yeoman, published in The New New South.
Videos and photograph at NME.com

NAMM Oral History Interview March 19, 2015

1940 births
Living people
American blues guitarists
American male guitarists
American blues singers
American male singers
Delta blues musicians
Electric blues musicians
Fat Possum Records artists
Singers from Mississippi
People from McComb, Mississippi
Blues musicians from Mississippi
Guitarists from Mississippi
20th-century American guitarists
20th-century American male musicians